The University of Southern Mississippi, informally known as "Southern Miss", is home to more than 30 national fraternity and sorority chapters. These chapters are under the authority of various groups. IFC and Panhellenic groups are under the authority of Greek life. Non-affiliated fraternities and sororities such as Beta Upsilon Chi and Sigma Alpha Iota fall under the Department of Student Activities.

The fraternities and sororities which are currently on-campus at Southern Miss are:

IFC fraternities
 Acacia Fraternity (inactive)
 Alpha Tau Omega
 Delta Tau Delta
 Kappa Alpha Order (inactive)
 Kappa Sigma
 Pi Kappa Alpha 
 Pi Kappa Phi
 Phi Kappa Tau
 Sigma Alpha Epsilon
 Sigma Chi (inactive)
 Sigma Nu
 Sigma Phi Epsilon
 Tau Kappa Epsilon (inactive)

Other fraternities
 Mu Phi Epsilon, professional (music)
 Beta Upsilon Chi, religious (Christian)
 Phi Mu Alpha Sinfonia, social (music)

Panhellenic sororities
 Alpha Chi Omega
 Alpha Delta Pi
 Alpha Sigma Alpha (inactive)
 Chi Omega
 Delta Delta Delta
 Delta Gamma
 Delta Zeta (inactive)
 Kappa Alpha Theta (inactive)
 Kappa Delta
 Pi Beta Phi
 Phi Mu
 Sigma Sigma Sigma (inactive)

Other sororities
 Sigma Alpha Iota, professional (music)

National Panhellenic organizations
 Alpha Kappa Alpha
 Alpha Phi Alpha
 Delta Sigma Theta
 Iota Phi Theta
 Kappa Alpha Psi
 Omega Psi Phi
 Phi Beta Sigma
 Sigma Gamma Rho
 Zeta Phi Beta

References

Southern Mississippi, List of fraternities and sororities
Fraternities and sororities at Southern Miss
University of Southern Mississippi